California Proposition 7 may refer to:

California Proposition 7 (1911), Senate Constitutional Amendment No. 22
California Proposition 7 (1978), Death Penalty Act
California Proposition 7 (2008), Standards for Renewable Resource Portfolios

See also
Proposition 7 (disambiguation)